is a third-person shooter game for the Nintendo 64, developed by Yuke's and published by Hudson Soft. It was released exclusively in Japan in May 1999.

External Links 
https://web.archive.org/web/20040815041024/http://www.hudson.co.jp:80/gamenavi/gamedb/index.cgi?mode=info&f=LastLegionUX
https://web.archive.org/web/20040815112031/http://www.hudson.co.jp:80/gamenavi/gamedb/softinfo/legion/index.html
English Translation patch at romhacking.net

References 

Hudson Soft games
Nintendo 64 games
Nintendo 64-only games
1999 video games
Japan-exclusive video games
Third-person shooters
Video games developed in Japan
Yuke's games